James Pond 2: Codename: RoboCod, also known as Super James Pond on SNES in North America, and Game Boy, and Super James Pond 2 in Europe, is a 1991 platform video game. It was developed by the same British teams as the original. The title music by Richard Joseph is a marimba-heavy rendition of the RoboCop film theme. It is the second installment in the James Pond series.

James Pond 2 was originally released on the Amiga, Atari ST and Sega Genesis in 1991 by three different publishers. It was next ported to Amiga AGA, Amiga CD32, Game Gear, Commodore 64, Master System, PC, Acorn Archimedes, Game Boy and SNES. It was later redeveloped and released as a budget title for the Game Boy Advance, Nintendo DS, PlayStation, PlayStation 2, as a download on the PlayStation Portable and PlayStation 3 via the PlayStation Network store, and the Nintendo Switch.

Gameplay

James Pond starts outside Santa's toy factory. There are many doors, each of which leads to a stage with many differently-themed levels, 50 in total. Meanies lurk in these levels, and they come in many forms. There are no weapons in the game, so James Pond must jump on them to defeat them. After completing two "doors", James Pond goes on to another door where a guardian awaits.

James Pond's body armor enables him to extend his body vertically to incredible lengths and grab hold of the ceiling or platforms above him. This allows him to travel along with the ceiling and drop down on the top of an unsuspecting enemy, or to get to otherwise inaccessible areas. James Pond can also pick up items that provide points. Power-ups include extra lives and wings that grant James the ability to fly. From time to time, James Pond may enter vehicles, namely cars, planes, or flying bathtubs.

Plot
The game takes place immediately after its predecessor. Although Acme Oil Company has been destroyed by James Pond, his arch enemy Dr. Maybe survived and has retreated to the North Pole where he has taken over Santa's workshop. Dr. Maybe is holding Santa's workers hostage (in most versions of the game they are penguins, in some, they are elves), and has turned many of Santa's helpers into his own twisted and dangerous assistants. James Pond is recruited to infiltrate Santa's grotto, free the captive penguins, retrieve the stolen toys for the children of the world, and defeat Dr. Maybe once and for all. This time, however, due to the greater risks involved in this mission, James Pond is given a robotic suit and the code name "RoboCod" (a play on RoboCop). This suit gives Pond superhuman strength and agility as well as enabling him to stretch his midsection almost indefinitely and reach otherwise impossibly high areas.

Product placement
In the original UK version of the game, the penguins featured as in-game product placement for the McVitie's biscuit company's Penguin Biscuits.  The 1991 EA release in the U.S. and Euro market featured the penguin in a Christmas scene in box art by illustrator Marc Ericksen. According to a 1994 article in the UK edition of PC Gamer, Penguin outsold arch-rival KitKat for the first time in the product's history soon after the release of the game.

Game Boy Advance, Nintendo DS, Nintendo Switch, and PlayStation versions

James Pond: Codename Robocod was released for the Game Boy Advance and PlayStation in 2003, the Nintendo DS in 2005, the PlayStation 2 in 2006, the PlayStation Network in 2009, and the Nintendo Switch in 2019. The handheld and PlayStation releases are identical except for the DS version, which features a map on the second screen. All these versions of the game are largely different from that of the original. The graphics have been improved to take advantage of the consoles' newer hardware, and while the levels retain some of the themes of the originals, their layout is entirely different. In the new versions, McVities' sponsorship branding has been removed from the game, and RoboCod must rescue Santa's elves, rather than penguins. In addition, the hidden levels have been omitted entirely. These recent iterations are remakes rather than ports of the original game.

Reception

UK magazine ACE gave the Amiga version a score of 934 out of 1000, calling it "polished, playable and (...) fun" and "completely excellent". Electronic Gaming Monthly gave the SNES version a 5 out of 10, commenting that "James's ability to make himself tall is quite interesting, but that is really the only special thing about him. Fans of JP may be better off with his Aquatic Games". They gave the Amiga CD32 version a 5.5 out of 10. Though they praised the soundtrack, they remarked that the garishly colorful graphics tend to cause eye strain, the gameplay is mildly fun but unexciting, and that aside from the "extremely pixelated" full motion video intro, it is identical to the version on the less powerful Sega Genesis. Mega Action gave the Genesis version a score of 92% writing: "Better than the original and a massive playing to boot. This features all the ingredients that its predecessor offered, plus plenty more." Power Unlimited gave the SNES version a score of 75% commenting: "The only remarkable thing about Super James Pond is that it is a wacky parody of James Bond. Unfortunately, there is very little of this in the game. Furthermore, it is a usual, beautifully designed and musical platformer."

Mega placed the game at number 20 in their Top Mega Drive Games of All Time.

References

External links
 

1991 video games
Acorn Archimedes games
Amiga 1200 games
Amiga CD32 games
Amiga games
Atari ST games
Christmas video games
Commodore 64 games
DOS games
Game Boy Advance games
Game Boy games
Game Gear games
James Pond
Master System games
Nintendo DS games
Nintendo Switch games
Ocean Software games
Platform games
PlayStation (console) games
PlayStation 2 games
PlayStation Network games
Sega Genesis games
Side-scrolling video games
Single-player video games
Super Nintendo Entertainment System games
Tiertex Design Studios games
U.S. Gold games
Valcon Games games
Vectordean games
Video game sequels
Video games developed in the United Kingdom
Video games scored by Richard Joseph